Venstre, full name Venstre, Danmarks Liberale Parti, is a conservative-liberal, agrarian political party in Denmark. Founded as part of a peasants' movement against the landed aristocracy, today it espouses an economically liberal, pro-free-market ideology.

Venstre is the major party of the centre-right in Denmark, and the second-largest party in the country. The party has produced many Prime Ministers. In the 2019 general elections, Venstre received 23.4% of the vote and 43 out of 179 seats. Its current leader is Jakob Ellemann-Jensen following the resignation of Lars Løkke Rasmussen as chairman on 31 August 2019. Since December 2022, the party has been a junior partner in the second Frederiksen government.

The party is a member of Liberal International and the Alliance of Liberals and Democrats for Europe (ALDE) and has four MEPs in the European Parliament.

Ideology
Venstre is categorised as centre-right on the political spectrum, although it has been also described as centrist and right-wing. Ideologically, it has been described as conservative-liberal, classical-liberal, liberal-conservative, liberal, agrarian, and conservative. Additionally, Venstre takes a tough stance regarding immigration and asylums; they had also said that "immigrants should learn Danish and understand and respect Danish culture and traditions".

Venstre is a market liberal party within the Nordic agrarian tradition, and today is notably more pro–free market than its sister parties. Since the elections in 2001, Venstre has enacted a so-called "tax stop" in order to halt the growth in taxes seen during the previous eight years under the Social Democrats. This tax stop has been under heavy fire from the parties on the left wing of Danish politics, allegedly for being "asocial" and "only for the rich."

History

1870–1910 
Venstre was founded in 1870 under the name Det Forenede Venstre ("The United Left") and originally consisted of multiple conflicting groups, all united under the classical liberal (then the standard left-wing) ideology, the safeguarding of farmers' interests and opposition to the then right-wing classical conservative party Højre (literally "Right"). After the party in 1872 gained an absolute majority in the Folketing, it became the leading voice in the battle for parliamentarism, whereafter the party in 1895 split in two, Venstrereformpartiet ("Venstre Reform Party") and Det Moderate Venstre ("The Moderate Left"). In 1905, social liberal factions split from the party and formed Radikale Venstre (also known as the Danish Social Liberal Party), and in 1910 Venstrereformpartiet and Det Moderate Venstre reunited again under the name Venstre.

1910–2009 
With the decreasing numbers of farms and the growing urbanisation, membership and voter support dropped in the 1950s. During the 1960s the party gradually evolved from being a traditional farmers' party to a more general liberal party. In 1984 Uffe Ellemann-Jensen was elected chairman, and by profiling the liberal ideology in sharp confrontation to the Social Democrats, for example by campaigning for a reduction of the public sector, increasing market management and privatisation, and by being pro-EU, the party returned to its historical position as the biggest liberal party in the 1990s.

After a disappointing 1998 general election, Ellemann-Jensen resigned as chairman and Anders Fogh Rasmussen was elected in his place. He immediately changed the party's usual confrontational strategy, instead appealing to the political centre. In the 2001 general elections the party campaigned for tighter immigration policies and a "tax stop", which proved successful and the party once again became the biggest in parliament, winning 31.2% of the vote and 56 seats. Venstre formed a coalition government with the Conservative People's Party and the Danish People's Party. For the first time since 1929 a liberal government was no longer dependent on the centre parties. Despite a small decline in both the 2005 general elections (29% and 52 seats) and the 2007 general elections (26.2% and 46 seats), the party remained the biggest and the coalition government continued.

On 5 April 2009 Fogh Rasmussen resigned as chairman, instead serving as Secretary General of NATO. In his place Lars Løkke Rasmussen was elected.

2009–present 
In the 2011 general elections the party gained 26.7% of the vote and 47 seats, but was not able to form a government, instead leading the opposition of Prime Minister Helle Thorning-Schmidt's Social Democratic coalition.

Even though the party lost voter support in the 2015 general elections, only gaining 19.5% of the vote, the party formed a minority government. This government was short-lived, and in 2016 Løkke Rasmussen invited the Conservative People's Party and the Liberal Alliance to form a coalition government instead.

During the campaign of the 2019 general elections Løkke Rasmussen published an autobiography, in which he opened up for the possibility of forming a government with the Social Democrats. This was seen as controversial in the liberal "blue bloc", and Social Democratic leader Mette Frederiksen immediately declined the proposition.

Following internal fighting in the party, Løkke Rasmussen and vice chairman Kristian Jensen both resigned on 31 August 2019. On 21 September 2019 political spokesman and former Minister for Environment and Food Jakob Ellemann-Jensen was elected the party's next chairman.

Following the 2022 general election, in which Venstre suffered its worst result since 1988, Venstre joined a grand coalition government led by Social Democrat leader Mette Frederiksen, and also comprising the Moderates, a Venstre splinter formed by former Prime Minister Lars Løkke Rasmussen.

Prime Ministers
 Johan Henrik Deuntzer (July 24, 1901January 14, 1905)
 Jens Christian Christensen (January 14, 1905October 12, 1908)
 Niels Neergaard (October 12, 1908August 16, 1909)
 Ludvig Holstein-Ledreborg (August 16, 1909October 28, 1909)
 Klaus Berntsen (July 5, 1910June 21, 1913)
 Niels Neergaard (May 5, 1920April 23, 1924)
 Thomas Madsen-Mygdal (December 14, 1926April 30, 1929)
 Knud Kristensen (November 7, 1945November 13, 1947)
 Erik Eriksen (October 30, 1950September 30, 1953)
 Poul Hartling (December 19, 1973February 13, 1975)
 Anders Fogh Rasmussen (November 27, 2001April 5, 2009)
 Lars Løkke Rasmussen (April 5, 2009October 3, 2011; June 28, 2015June 27, 2019)

Leaders since 1929

Origin of the name
The fact that the major centre-right political party in a country calls itself 'Left' is often confusing to foreign (and sometimes Danish) observers. The name has, however, its historical explanation. At the time of its foundation, Venstre affirmed then-progressive ideas in the Danish parliament. Their opponents, Højre (Right), the forerunner of the present-day Conservative People's Party, advocated for established interests, particularly the Church of Denmark and the landed gentry. In current Danish politics there is a clear distinction between the concepts of Venstre (Left, i.e., the party bearing that name) and venstrefløj (left wing, i.e., socialist and other left-leaning parties). The use of the word for "left" in the name of the Danish political party Radikale Venstre (literally: "Radical Left") and the Norwegian party Venstre is meant to refer to liberalism and not socialism.

Members of the party are referred to as venstremænd and venstrekvinder, respectively "Venstre men" and "Venstre women" (singular: -mand, -kvinde).

Election results

Parliament

Local elections

European Parliament

European representation 
In the European Parliament, Venstre sits in the Renew Europe group with four MEPs.

In the European Committee of the Regions, Venstre sits in the Renew Europe CoR group, with three full and two alternate members for the 2020–2025 mandate.

Youth and student wings
 Venstres Ungdom
 Liberal Students of Denmark (Danmarks Liberale Studerende)

See also
 Liberalism
 Contributions to liberal theory
 Liberalism worldwide
 List of liberal parties
 Liberal democracy
 Liberalism and radicalism in Denmark
 Nordic agrarian parties

Notes

References

Further reading
 Tom Matz (2004), Venstre ved du hvor du har . ForlagsKompagniet: Nørhaven Book.

External links

  Venstre official site
 Denmark's Liberal Party presentation in English
  Party Profile from the newspaper Politiken

1870 establishments in Denmark
Liberal parties in Denmark
Political parties established in 1870
Classical liberal parties
Conservative liberal parties
Liberal conservative parties
Liberal International
Neoliberal parties
Nordic agrarian parties
Alliance of Liberals and Democrats for Europe Party member parties